João Bosco Soares da Mota Amaral (born 15 April 1943, in Ponta Delgada, São Miguel, Azores) is a Portuguese politician. He served as President of the Assembly of the Republic of Portugal from 2002 to 2005 and President of the Autonomous Regional Government of the Azores from 1976 to 1995.

Career
He earned a Master's degree in Law from the Faculty of Law of the University of Lisbon and is a Doctorate honoris causa in Economic Sciences from the University of the Azores.

He integrated the Liberal Wing, led by Francisco Sá Carneiro, and was elected a Deputy to the National Assembly in 1969.

He was one of the Founders of the then Popular Democratic Party (PPD) in May 1974, a month after the Carnation Revolution, together with Francisco Sá Carneiro, Francisco Pinto Balsemão, Joaquim Magalhães Mota, Carlos Mota Pinto, Alberto João Jardim, António Barbosa de Melo and António Marques Mendes, being responsible for the Foundation of the branch of Azores, becoming a Deputy to the Constituent Assembly and to the Assembly of the Republic in all legislatures.

He was the first President of the Azores from 1976 to 1995.

He was the Vice-President of the Assembly of the Portuguese Republic in the 7th and the 8th Legislatures (30 October 1995 - 4 April 2002) and a Member of the Delegation of the Assembly of the Republic to the Parliamentary Assembly of the European Council and the Western European Union in the same Legislatures, reintegrating them into the 10th.

He was President of the Assembly of the Republic of Portugal from 9 April 2002 to 9 March 2005.

He was also a Member of the Portuguese Council of State from 1982 to 1995 and the President of the Azores again from 9 April 2002 to 9 March 2005 as the President of the Assembly of the Republic.

Family
He has never married and has no children.

Honours

Portuguese Honours 

  Grand-Cross of the Order of Prince Henry (19 April 1986)
  Grand-Cross of the Order of Prince Henry (12 December 1995)

Foreign Honours 

  Grand-Officer of the National Order of Merit, France (28 January 1991)
  Grand-Officer of the Order of Merit , Germany (18 May 1999)
  Grand-Cross of the Order of Merit, Hungary (16 October 2002)
  Grand-Cross of the Order of the Southern Cross, Brazil (16 September 2003)
  Grand-Cross of the Order of Merit, Poland (8 July 2004)
  Grand-Cross of the Order of Merit, Austria (31 January 2005)
  Grand-Cross of the Order of Bernardo O'Higgins, Chile (12 December 2005)

References

Notes

Sources
 Os Presidentes do Parlamento (Presidents of the Portuguese Parliament), Assembly of the Republic

1943 births
Living people
Presidents of the Government of the Azores
Members of the Assembly of the Republic (Portugal)
Presidents of the Assembly of the Republic (Portugal)
Social Democratic Party (Portugal) politicians
People from Ponta Delgada
University of Lisbon alumni
Recipients of the Order of Merit of the Federal Republic of Germany